Fuel system may refer to:
Aircraft fuel system
in automobiles and their industry, the combination of fuel tanks, fuel pumps, fuel pipes, fuel injection